Override is a 1994 American science fiction short film. It was the directorial debut of Danny Glover and starred Lou Diamond Phillips and Emily Lloyd. It is based on the Nebula- and Hugo-nominated short story "Over the Long Haul", by Martha Soukup.

The film was part of Showtime's Directed By... series that showcased well-known Hollywood actors stepping behind the camera as first-time film directors.

References

External links

1994 short films
1990s science fiction films
1994 films
American short films
1990s English-language films